Al-Ashraf Abu al-Nasir Janbalat (1455 – 1501) was a Mamluk sultan of Egypt from 30 June 1500 to 25 January 1501.

References

Burji sultans
15th-century Mamluk sultans
16th-century Mamluk sultans
1455 births
1501 deaths